Bettendorf High School (BHS) is a public four-year comprehensive high school located in Bettendorf, Iowa and is part of the Bettendorf Community School District.

History

Early history
Prior to its opening in 1951, there was no high school in Bettendorf. High school-age students living in the city had to go to Davenport High School or Le Claire High School to receive their secondary education.

The original BHS building was completed in 1951 at a site between 21st and 23rd streets south of Central Avenue. In its very early years, the high school housed seventh through 12th grade students, although junior high students were moved by the late 1950s.

The community of Bettendorf quickly grew during the 1950s and 1960s, and by the early 1960s, the district had outgrown the school due to increasing enrollment. Students walked to some classes in rented store fronts on State and Grant Streets, while an annex building (which later became Neil Armstrong Elementary) also helped serve students. By 1971, with enrollment still growing at a fast pace, plans were started to build a new high school along 18th Street in the northern part of the city, roughly 1½ miles north of Middle Road.

The former BHS building had a track/baseball field on the front side and a football field on the back side; both are still evident at the site. The old school's athletic facilities were used for a number of years after the opening of the new high school. The old football field was used on a varsity level until 1980, when Touvelle Stadium was completed, while the old BHS gymnasium was utilized by lower level teams until the mid-1980s. Today, the old BHS building is the headquarters for the Mississippi Bend Area Education Agency District 9, which oversees public school education across east-central Iowa.

Current high school
The current high school building was completed in 1973, at a cost of roughly $3 million. At the time of its opening, BHS was on the edge of town, surrounded by mostly undeveloped land. A subsequent addition added a new industrial arts/locker room and an athletic stadium completed in 1980. The six-building, air-conditioned complex is highlighted by a landscaped inner courtyard, planetarium, library/media center, computer labs, a 405-seat auditorium, and a field house with a 6-lane, 25-yard swimming pool. In 2007, an addition to the music and drama area was completed.

A new  facility is attached to the east side of the high school and accessible to all athletic and physical education areas. The center houses weights and exercise and cardiovascular equipment.

A group of community members organized the BHS Fitness Education Center Committee and raised $300,000 in funds for the fitness education center at Bettendorf High School. The Bettendorf School Board matched $300,000 to fund the $600,000 project. The project was completed in the summer of 2002.

In 2010, copies of the student newspaper, The Growl, were confiscated by school administrators because of an article about inconsistent disciplinary action against students, specifically athletes.

Renovations to the high school took about three years to complete from October 2011 to March 2013, with an estimated cost of $16.2 million.

A $3.25 million renovation project to TouVelle Stadium began in May and finished in August, in time for the 2014 season. The upgrades replaced the stadium's grass field with synthetic turf, reconfiguration of the eight-lane track and a new lighting system among others.

Music
The music department has a marching band, freshmen band, symphonic band, orchestra, wind ensemble, jazz band, pep band, chorus, a prep group show choir named 'Audio Intensity', and a show choir named 'Surround Sound'.

Athletics
The Bulldogs compete in the Mississippi Athletic Conference(MAC), in the following sports:
 Summer: Baseball and softball
 Fall: Football, volleyball, girls' swimming, boys'cross country, girls' cross country, boys' golf 
 Winter: Boys' basketball, girls' basketball, girls' bowling, boys' swimming, wrestling 
 Spring: Boys' track and field, girls' track and field, boys' soccer, girls' soccer, boys' tennis, girls' tennis, girls' golf

State Championships
 Boys' Basketball (2-time State Champions - 1986, 2005)
 Girls' Basketball - 1994 Class 4A State Champions
 Girls' Cross Country (3-time State Champions (1977, 1984, 1987)
 Football (7-time Class 4A State Champions - 1981, 1987, 1988, 1991, 1992, 2004, 2007)
 Boys' Golf (5-time State Champions - 1978, 2004, 2005, 2006, 2007)
 Boys' Soccer (3-time State Champions - 1995, 1999, 2004)
 Girls' Soccer (1998 State Champions)
 Boys' Swimming (4-time state Champions - 1978, 1986, 1999, 2007)
 Girls' Swimming (7-time state Champions - 1990, 1991, 1992, 1999, 2000, 2001, 2002)
 Boys' Tennis - 2004 Class 2A State Champions
 Girls' Tennis (7-time Class 2A State Champions - 1995, 1996, 1997, 1998, 1999, 2000, 2003)
 Girls' Track and Field (3-time Class 3A State Champions - 1986, 1989, 1990)
 Volleyball (2-time Class 5A State Champions - 2012, 2013)
 Wrestling (4-time Class 3A State Champions - 1981, 1982, 2012, 2014) 
 Wrestling (2-time Class 3A State Duals Champions - 2012, 2014)

Notable alumni

 Pat Angerer, former NFL linebacker for the Indianapolis Colts (–2013) and Atlanta Falcons.
 Scott Beck, Screenwriter, Director 
 Bryan Woods, Screenwriter, Director 
 D.J. Carton, NBA player for the Greensboro Swarm of the G League
 Tavian Banks, former NFL running back for the Jacksonville Jaguars (–2000) and New Orleans Saints (–2004)
 JP Flynn, former NFL offensive lineman for the San Francisco 49ers
 Frank Fritz, American Pickers
 Jordan Johnson, UFC Middleweight
 Mark Kerr, 2-time NCAA Wrestling Champion; retired MMA fighter; 2-time UFC Heavyweight Tournament Winner
 Robbie Lawler, professional MMA fighter, former UFC welterweight champion
 Michael "Drew" McFedries, former UFC fighter
 Pat Miletich, retired professional Mixed Martial Artist, first UFC Welterweight Champion, UFC Hall of Fame member
 Eric Christian Olsen, actor
 Linnea Quigley, actress
 Mike Wolfe, American Pickers
 Amber Hunt, Journalist, Podcaster
 Lana Zak, Journalist, CBS 
 Thomas D. Waterman, Justice, Iowa Supreme Court
 Andrew Yohe, U.S. Paralympian, Sled Hockey
 Samuel Silverstein, physicist, ATLAS
 Robert S. Gallagher, Mayor of Bettendorf, 2012–present
 Ann Hutchinson, former Mayor of Bettendorf, 1988–2003

See also
List of high schools in Iowa

References

External links
Bettendorf High School

Bettendorf, Iowa
Public high schools in Iowa
Schools in Scott County, Iowa
Educational institutions established in 1951
1951 establishments in Iowa